Nosratabad (also Romanized as Noşratābād) is a village in Dastgerdan Rural District, Dastgerdan District, Tabas County, South Khorasan Province, Iran. At the 2006 census, its population was 16, in 4 families.

References 

Populated places in Tabas County